Eero Rebo (born 19 December 1974, in Abja-Paluoja) is an Estonian Land Forces colonel.

From 2004 to 2007 he was the commander of Kuperjanov Infantry Battalion.

From 2015 to 2019 he was the commander of 2nd Infantry Brigade.

Since 2020 he is the head of the headquarters of Estonian Defence League.

References

Living people
1974 births
Estonian military personnel
21st-century Estonian military personnel
People from Abja-Paluoja